Ingress may refer to:

Science and technology
 Ingress (signal leakage), the passage of an outside signal into a coaxial cable
 Ingress filtering, a computer network packet filtering technique
 Ingress protection rating, a protection level that electrical appliances provide against intrusion of physical objects
 Ingress router, a source label switch router
 Ingress cancellation, a technology to digitally remove in-channel ingress

Legal
 Ingress, egress, and regress, property law terms
 Ingress into India Ordinance, 1914

Others
 Ingress (video game), a geolocation-based video game
 Ingress (TV series), a Japanese anime series based on the video game of the same name
 Ingress, Kent, England
 Ingress Bell (1837–1914), English architect

See also
 Jean-Auguste-Dominique Ingres (1780–1867), French Neoclassical painter
 Ingression (disambiguation)
 Egress (disambiguation)